The Kramář's Villa (Czech: Kramářova vila) is the official residence of the Prime Minister of the Czech Republic. It is located in Prague, known for its panorama of Prague Castle. It was built in 1914 by the First Prime Minister of Czechoslovakia, Karel Kramář. Since 1998, the villa has been the official residence of the Prime Minister of the Czech Republic.

Tenants 
 Karel Kramář (1914-1938)
 Miloš Zeman (1998-2002)
 Vladimír Špidla (2002-2004)
 Stanislav Gross (2004-2005)
 Jiří Paroubek (2005-2007)
 Mirek Topolánek (2007-2009)
 Jan Fischer (2009-2010)
 Petr Nečas (2010-2013)
 Jiří Rusnok (2013-2014)
 Bohuslav Sobotka (2014-2017)
 Andrej Babiš (2017–2021)
 Petr Fiala (2021-present)

References

Official residences in the Czech Republic
Prime ministerial residences
Houses completed in 1914
1914 establishments in Europe